is a football stadium in Tokyo, Japan.

It hosted the 1946 Emperor's Cup and final game between University of Tokyo LB and Kobe University of Economics Club was played there on May 5, 1946.

External links

Sports venues in Tokyo
Football venues in Japan